NA-65 (Gujrat-IV) is a constituency for the National Assembly of Pakistan.

Members of Parliament

2018-2022: NA-69 Gujrat-II

Election 2002 

General elections were held on 10 Oct 2002. Chaudhry Shujaat Hussain of PML-Q won by 66,809 votes.

Election 2008 

General elections were held on 18 Feb 2008. Chaudhry Ahmed Mukhtar of PPP won by 79,735 votes.

Election 2013 

General elections were held on 11 May 2013. Chaudhary Pervez Elahi of PML-Q won by 78,171 votes and became the  member of National Assembly.

Election 2018 
General elections were held on 25 July 2018. Chaudhry Pervaiz Elahi of Pakistan Muslim League (Q) won the election but vacated this constituency in favor of speakership of Punjab Assembly.

By-election 2018
By-elections were held in this constituency on 14 October 2018.

See also
NA-64 Gujrat-III
NA-66 Sialkot-I

References

External links
Election result's official website
Delimitation 2018 official website Election Commission of Pakistan

69
69